Gheen Corner is an unincorporated community in Saint Louis County, Minnesota, United States.

The community is located between Cook and Orr at the junction of U.S. Highway 53, County Road 74 (Willow River Road), and County Road 905.

Gheen Corner is located along the boundary line between Willow Valley Township and Gheen Unorganized Territory in Saint Louis County.

The unincorporated community of Gheen is also nearby.

References

Unincorporated communities in Minnesota
Unincorporated communities in St. Louis County, Minnesota